Sports Jobs with Junior Seau was a television reality program/documentary series on Versus hosted by retired National Football League player Junior Seau. The program premiered on December 2, 2009; the final episode ran on January 27, 2010.

The program depicted Seau exploring a variety of support and behind-the-scenes jobs in the sports industry. The program was produced by Mandt Bros. Productions.

Episodes
Giants Stadium Construction Crew
Dodgers Batboy
Washington Capitals(tm) Equipment Manager
TD Garden Arena Conversion Team
Indycar Pit Crew Member
LPGA Caddy
Sports Illustrated Reporter
UFC Cornerman
Horse Trainer
PBR Bull Fighter

References

External links

TV.com

2009 American television series debuts
2010 American television series endings
NBCSN shows
2000s American reality television series
2010s American reality television series